The Men's Boxing Tournament at the 1959 Pan American Games was held in Chicago, United States, from August 27 to September 7.

Medal winners

Medal table

External links
Amateur Boxing

1959
Events at the 1959 Pan American Games
Pan American Games
1959 Pan American Games
1959 Pan American Games